McIntyre-Takhini is an electoral district which returned a member (known as an MLA) to the Legislative Assembly of the Yukon Territory in Canada. It was dissolved in 2009 into the ridings Takhini-Kopper King and Mountainview. It contained the Whitehorse subdivisions of Takhini, Valleyview, and McIntyre, as well as the Kopper King, Takhini, and Northland mobile home parks.

It is the former riding of Yukon's 5th Premier, Piers McDonald.

Members of the Legislative Assembly

Electoral results

2006 general election 

|-

| NDP
| John Edzerza
| align="right"|336
| align="right"|38.84
| align="right"|

| Liberal
| Ed Schultz
| align="right"|328
| align="right"|37.92
| align="right"|

|-
! align=left colspan=3|Total
! align=right|865
! align=right|100.0
|}

2002 general election

|-

| NDP
| Maureen Stephens
| align="right"|270
| align="right"|29.8
| align="right"|

| Liberal
| Judy Gingell
| align="right"|204
| align="right"|22.5
| align="right"|

| Independent
| Wayne Jim
| align="right"|129
| align="right"|14.2
| align="right"|

| Independent
| Geoffrey Capp
| align="right"|15
| align="right"|1.7
| align="right"|
|-
! align=left colspan=3|Total
! align=right|906
! align=right|100.0
|}

2000 general election

|-

| Liberal
| Wayne Jim
| align="right"|376
| align="right"|38.4
| align="right"|

| NDP
| Piers McDonald
| align="right"|338
| align="right"|34.5
| align="right"|

|-
! align=left colspan=3|Total
! align=right|979
! align=right|100.0
|}

1996 general election

|-

| NDP
| Piers McDonald
| align="right"|441
| align="right"|49.3
| align="right"|

| Liberal
| Rosemary Couch
| align="right"|182
| align="right"|20.3
| align="right"|

| Independent
| Clinton Fraser
| align="right"|21
| align="right"|2.4
| align="right"|
|-
! align=left colspan=3|Total
! align=right|895
! align=right|100.0
|}

1992 general election

|-

| NDP
| Piers McDonald
| align="right"| 313
| align="right"| 42.9
| align="right"|

| Liberal
| Larry Bill
| align="right"| 126
| align="right"| 17.3
| align="right"|

|-
! align=left colspan=3|Total
! align=right| 729
! align=right| 100
! align=right|
|}

References 
 McIntyre-Takhini - Yukon Votes 2006. Retrieved May 22, 2009.

Former Yukon territorial electoral districts
Politics of Whitehorse